Pristimantis colostichos is a species of frog in the family Strabomantidae.
It is endemic to Venezuela.
Its natural habitat is tropical high-altitude grassland.
It is threatened by habitat loss.

References

colostichos
Endemic fauna of Venezuela
Amphibians of Venezuela
Amphibians of the Andes
Amphibians described in 1982
Taxonomy articles created by Polbot